Stefan Vukmirović (born 19 July 1991) is a Serbian professional footballer who plays as an attacking midfielder.

Club career
He started his career in Šumadija Kragujevac. He played for Radnički Kragujevac, BASK, Jagodina and Jedinstvo Putevi. On the beginning of 2014, he arrived to Napredak Kruševac. Vukmirović later played for Sloboda Užice and Radnik Surdulica before he joined Borac Čačak in summer 2015. After a season with Borac, Vukmirović signed his second spell with Sloboda Užice in August 2016. At the beginning of 2017, he moved to Malaysia Premier League side Kuantan FA.

Honours
Radnik Surdulica
Serbian First League: 2014–15

References

External links
 
 
 Stefan Vukmirović stats at utakmica.rs

1991 births
Living people
Sportspeople from Kragujevac
Association football midfielders
Serbian footballers
FK Radnički 1923 players
FK BASK players
FK Jagodina players
FK Jedinstvo Užice players
FK Napredak Kruševac players
FK Sloboda Užice players
FK Radnik Surdulica players
FK Borac Čačak players
Serbian First League players
Serbian SuperLiga players
Serbian expatriate footballers
Serbian expatriate sportspeople in Malaysia
Expatriate footballers in Malaysia